Lorenzo Ferrari (born 22 October 2002) is an Italian racing driver. He is the reigning champion of the European Le Mans Series in the LMGTE class with Proton Competition.

Early career

Lower formulae 
Ferrari began his car racing career in 2019, competing for Antonelli Motorsport in the Italian F4 Championship. With a sole podium coming at Mugello, the Italian finished 17th in the standings.

Near the end of the year, Ferrari made a guest appearance in the Euroformula Open Championship with RP Motorsport.

Sporscar career

2020: Debut in GT3 
For the 2020 season, Ferrari switched to GT3 machinery, remaining with the renamed AKM Motorsport outfit for the Italian GT Championship. Aboard a Mercedes-AMG GT3, he ended up fifth in the Sprint standings, having taken a pair of victories.

2021: National glory 
Ferrari remained in the Italian GT Championship the following year, teaming up with Audi Sport Italia and partnering Riccardo Agostini and Audi factory driver Mattia Drudi. He would claim both the Sprint and Endurance titles, winning four and three times respectively.

2022: ELMS title 
A step to the international scene came in 2022, where Ferrari switched allegiance to Porsche and raced for Proton Competition in the European Le Mans Series, pairing up with works driver Gianmaria Bruni and team owner Christian Ried. The year began with a podium at Le Castellet, with teammate Bruni losing out on victory by a mere tenth of a second. During the second round in Imola however, contact on the opening lap would force the squad out of the race. This setback would be rectified at Monza, as, with Ried having taken pole position, the team ended up with another second place. At round four, Ferrari would help his team to take their only win of the season, winning in Barcelona to grab the championship lead. A pair of top-five finishes in the remaining two races meant that Ferrari, Bruni and Ried were crowned champions of the LMGTE category.

Ferrari combined his ELMS exploits with a GT World Challenge Europe Endurance Cup programme in Winward Racing's Gold Cup effort, sharing a Mercedes-AMG GT3 Evo with Lucas Auer and gentleman driver Jens Liebhauser. Despite getting class pole at the season opener in Imola, the trio struggled to find success and finished tenth in the Gold Cup standings with 31 points. They had achieved their first win at the Barcelona round, but a post-race penalty for Auer spinning Arjun Maini round on the final lap demoted them to sixth place. Ferrari's performances in the 2022 season earned him an upgrade to gold status in the FIA's driver categorisation for 2023.

Racing record

Racing career summary 

† As Ferrari was a guest driver, he was ineligible to score points.* Season still in progress.

Complete Italian F4 Championship results
(key) (Races in bold indicate pole position) (Races in italics indicate fastest lap)

Complete European Le Mans Series results 
(key) (Races in bold indicate pole position; results in italics indicate fastest lap)

References

External links 

 

2002 births
Living people
Italian racing drivers
Italian F4 Championship drivers
European Le Mans Series drivers
Euroformula Open Championship drivers
International GT Open drivers
ADAC GT Masters drivers
RP Motorsport drivers
Audi Sport drivers